Himmatpur is a village in Purwa block of Unnao district, Uttar Pradesh, India. In 2011, its population was 458, in 114 households. It has a primary school and no healthcare facilities.

The 1961 census recorded Himmatpur as comprising one hamlet with a population of 281 (142 male and 139 female) in 65 households and 64 physical houses. The area of the village was given as 214 acres.

References

Villages in Unnao district